Serafimovskoe Cemetery in northwestern Saint Petersburg's Primorsky District, contains a large number of burials as well as monuments and memorials to notable figures in Soviet and Russian history.

The cemetery was created from land set aside in 1903, with the first burial taking place on 28 May 1905. It was mainly a burial location for the poor of the area, as well as soldiers and sailors who died in the First World War. It rose to prominence in the Second World War when it became a site of numerous mass graves of those who died in the siege of Leningrad from 1941 to 1944. Since then leading figures from a variety of sections of society have been interred in the cemetery. Saint Petersburg's history as a naval base have made the cemetery a popular location for naval officers. Those buried at the Serafimovskoe Cemetery include Giorgi Abashvili, Vladimir Alafuzov, Ivan Yumashev, and Mikhail Zakharov. There are also memorials to several maritime accidents and disasters, including the sinking of the ships Mekhanik Tarasov and Polessk, and the loss of the submarines Kursk and Komsomolets. On 6 July 2019 the fourteen men who died in a fire aboard the submarine Losharik were interred in the cemetery. A memorial also commemorates the dead of the 1981 Pushkin Tu-104 crash, which included a large number of Soviet Navy officers. Other military figures interred in the cemetery include Soviet Air Force Lieutenant General Dmitry Alexandrovich Medvedev, two flying aces of the Korean War; Anatoly Karelin and Mikhail Mikhin, and Major General Sergei Ivanovich Tiulpanov, who commanded the Propaganda Administration of the Soviet Military Administration in Germany.

Numerous sportspeople have also been buried here, among whom; Olympians Valentin Boreyko, Igor Novikov, Nikolai Panin, Nikolay Puzanov, Rinnat Safin and Gennadiy Tsygankov; footballers Lev Burchalkin, Valentin Fyodorov, Vladimir Kazachyonok, Nikolai Lyukshinov, Nikolai Sokolov and Yevgeni Yeliseyev. From the world of arts, painters Dmitry Belyaev, Pavel Filonov, Boris Lavrenko, Joseph Serebriany, and Nina Veselova; actors Glikeriya Bogdanova-Chesnokova, Aleksandr Demyanenko, Igor Dmitriev, Irina Gubanova, Pavel Kadochnikov, Nikolai Kryukov, Lev Lemke, Sergey Mikaelyan, Gennadiy Michurin, Antonina Shuranova, and Mikhail Svetin; dancers Boris Fenster, Alla Sizova, Yuri Soloviev and Sergei Vikharev; musicians Vitaly Bujanovsky, Boris Gutnikov and Yuri Morozov; and architect Iosif Langbard were all buried here. The parents of Vladimir Putin were also interred here, in 1998 and 1999.

Joint memorials commemorate the dead of various accidents and tragedies. As well as naval memorials, there are ones to those who died in the Siege of Leningrad, the Soviet–Afghan War, the Chernobyl disaster, an avalanche on Lenin Peak, in the Pamir Mountains, and the 1991 fire at the hotel Leningrad.

Individuals

Military

Sport

Arts

Sciences

Politics and business

Group memorials

Notes

References

Serafimovskoe Cemetery